Backbreakanomics is a studio album from American underground hip hop duo Mars Ill. It was released on Gotee Records in 2003.

Track listing

References

External links
 

Mars Ill albums
Gotee Records albums
2003 albums